Cherokee High School is a Bureau of Indian Education (BIE) grant high school located in Cherokee, North Carolina and administered by the federally recognized Eastern Band of Cherokee Indians. They have their base in Cherokee. The school was originally housed in a 1950s/1960s building. It moved to a new facility constructed for it, which opened in 2009.

Cherokee High School is part of the Cherokee Central Schools System.  It is the only 9–12 high school on Qualla Boundary, and shares a campus with Cherokee Elementary and Cherokee Middle School.

Accreditation
The school is accredited by the Southern Association of Colleges and Schools and by the North Carolina Department of Public Instruction.

Notable faculty
Amanda Crowe
Goingback Chiltoskey

References

External links

http://www.publicschoolreview.com/school_ov/school_id/91539
http://www.greatschools.org/north-carolina/cherokee/3265-Cherokee-High-School/

Bureau of Indian Education
Eastern Band of Cherokee Indians
Native American high schools
Public high schools in North Carolina
Schools in Swain County, North Carolina
Native American history of North Carolina